Tandrang is a Village Development Committee in Gorkha District in the Gandaki Zone of northern-central Nepal. At the time of the 1991 Nepal census it had a population of 4,368 and had 838 houses in the town.

References

Populated places in Gorkha District